Zavikon Island refers to either the larger or the pair of islands in the Thousand Islands archipelago on the St. Lawrence River between New York and Ontario, two kilometres (1¼ miles) southeast of Rockport, Ontario and about  north of the international boundary. As confirmed by the Canadian Department of Natural Resources, Zavikon Island is located in Canadian territory and is part of the township of Leeds and the Thousand Islands in The United Counties of Leeds and Grenville.

Overview
The smaller and more southeasterly of the pair of islands is sometimes called Little Zavikon Island.

A popular but incorrect tale among local guides is that the larger island is in Canada, while "Little Zavikon Island" is in the United States, and the footbridge between them is the "shortest international bridge in the world", as both islands are in fact in Canada.

References

External links

 "The World's Shortest International Bridge." Atlas Obscura

Islands of the Thousand Islands in Ontario
Landforms of Leeds and Grenville United Counties